Certificate of honor is an award issued by various establishments. It may refer to:

Russian Federation Presidential Certificate of Honour, Russian award
Sijil Kemuliaan, Singaporean award